Abdourammane Mohamed Coly (born 2 February 1984) is a Senegalese footballer who currently plays for Italian Serie C club Pergolettese.

Career
Coly began his career with AS Douanes and joined Parma A.C. in 2000, playing in the Primavera team. In summer 2003 he left club Parma A.C. to sign with the Serie D club U.S.O. Calcio. In the first half of the season 2003–2004 he featured in 22 games before leaving in January 2004 to join Serie C1 team U.S. Cremonese. In his two years there he only earned one cap and in July 2005 he signed in for P.D. Castellarano where he became a key player playing 56 games over two years. For the 2007–2008 season he transferred to Crociati Noceto making 28 appearances in the Serie D.

Subsequently, Coly moved to Lega Pro Seconda Divisione team A.C. Rodengo Saiano who played the playoffs to the Lega Pro Prima Divisione. In August 2010 he was loaned to Varese. On 24 January 2011 he was loaned to Taranto.

In the summer of 2012 he moved to the Citadella. Two years later he switched to Pro Vercelli.

In 2016, he returned to Parma.

On 23 August 2019, he signed with Pergolettese.

International career
Coly was a member of the Senegal national football team and was part of the 2009 African Nations Championship squad.

References

External links

1984 births
Footballers from Dakar
Living people
Senegalese footballers
Senegalese expatriate footballers
A.C. Rodengo Saiano players
AS Douanes (Senegal) players
Parma Calcio 1913 players
U.S. Cremonese players
A.S. Cittadella players
F.C. Pro Vercelli 1892 players
U.S. Pergolettese 1932 players
Serie B players
Serie C players
Serie D players
Expatriate footballers in Italy
Association football defenders
Senegalese expatriate sportspeople in Italy
P.D. Castellarano players
2009 African Nations Championship players
Senegal A' international footballers